The Bloomingdale School District is a comprehensive public school district serving students in pre-kindergarten through eighth grade from Bloomingdale, in Passaic County, New Jersey, United States.

As of the 2019–20 school year, the district, comprised of three schools, had an enrollment of 564 students and 44.8 classroom teachers (on an FTE basis), for a student–teacher ratio of 12.6:1.

The district is classified by the New Jersey Department of Education as being in District Factor Group "FG", the fourth-highest of eight groupings. District Factor Groups organize districts statewide to allow comparison by common socioeconomic characteristics of the local districts. From lowest socioeconomic status to highest, the categories are A, B, CD, DE, FG, GH, I and J.

For ninth through twelfth grades, high school-aged students from Bloomingdale in public school attend Butler High School in the adjacent community of Butler in Morris County, as part of a sending/receiving relationship with the Butler Public Schools. As of the 2019–20 school year, the high school had an enrollment of 471 students and 38.3 classroom teachers (on an FTE basis), for a student–teacher ratio of 12.3:1. In 2020–21, more than 40% of the students in the high school came from Bloomingdale.

Schools
Schools in the district (with 2019–20 enrollment data from the National Center for Education Statistics) are:
Elementary schools
Martha B. Day Elementary School with 142 students in grades PreK-1
Karen Husser, Principal
Samuel R. Donald Elementary School with 173 students in grades 2-4
Kerridyn Trushiem, Principal
Middle school
Walter T. Bergen Middle School with 241 students in grades 5-8
Jon Deeb, Principal

Administration
Core members of the district's administration are:
Dr. Michael Nicosia, Acting Superintendent
Donna Alonso, Interim Business Administrator / Board Secretary

Board of education
The district's board of education is comprised of nine members who set policy and oversee the fiscal and educational operation of the district through its administration. As a Type II school district, the board's trustees are elected directly by voters to serve three-year terms of office on a staggered basis, with three seats up for election each year held (since 2012) as part of the November general election. The board appoints a superintendent to oversee the district's day-to-day operations and a business administrator to supervise the business functions of the district.

References

External links
Bloomingdale School District official website
 
School Data for the Bloomingdale School District, National Center for Education Statistics

Bloomingdale, New Jersey
New Jersey District Factor Group FG
School districts in Passaic County, New Jersey